Estadio Alsalsias is a football stadium in La Entrada, Honduras. It is currently used mostly for football matches and is the home stadium of Olimpia Occidental.  The stadium holds 2,000 people.

References 

Alsalsias